Saint Mary's Faughanvale GAA is a Gaelic Athletic Association club based in Greysteel, County Londonderry, Northern Ireland. The club is a member of the Derry GAA and currently cater for Gaelic football, Ladies' Gaelic football.

Faughanvale have won the Derry Intermediate Football Championship five times and the Derry Junior Football Championship once. The club's catchment area includes Greysteel, Eglinton, Ballykelly, Enagh, Highlands and parts of Glack. Underage teams up to U-12's play in North Derry league and championships, from U-14 upwards teams compete in All-Derry competitions.

Gaelic football
Faughanvale fields Gaelic football teams at U8, U10, U12, U14, U16, Minor, Reserve and Senior levels. They currently compete in the Derry Intermediate Championship. Having won Division 4 of the Derry ACFL in 2007, in 2008 they maintained their position in Division 3 in 2009.

Ladies' Gaelic football
As well as Minor and Senior Ladies' football teams, St Mary's fields U12, U14 and U16 teams.

Faughanvale ladies have won the intermediate championship on 6 occasions 2003, 2006, 2011, 2014, 2018 & 2020.

Hurling and Camogie
The camogie and hurling teams ceased playing in 1989.

History
St Mary's GAC Faughanvale was established in 1933. A camogie team was founded in 1946 and affiliated to the club, before folding in 1989.

The club's first major success came in 1943 when they won the North Derry Senior Football Championship, before losing to Lavey in the All-Derry Senior Championship final. In 1975 Faughanvale won the Derry Junior Football Championship. Three years later St Mary's won the Derry Intermediate Football Championship and have won the competition a further four times since (1981, 1996, 1998, 1999). In 2014 Faughanvale were relegated from the Intermediate league. In 2015, for the first time in 40 years, they competed at Junior Level. In 2015 Faughanvale won a treble of Neil Carlin Cup, Division 3 League, and their second Derry Junior Championship. Faughanvale was awarded Irish News Rural Club of the Year 2005 by The Irish News.

The club purchased its current grounds in 1982, before this football was played at the O'Neill family's field on the Clooney Road. When the new pitch opened in 1983 it was named after one of the founding club members and former Chairman of the Derry County Board, John McLaughlin. In May 2007 the club began a £1.2million redevelopment of their playing facilities at John McLaughlin Park and opened the new grounds in May 2009.

In 2008 the club took part in the Celebrity Bainisteoir programme and were managed by journalist Nell McCafferty.

Notable club members include Paul Bradley who won an All-Ireland minor medal with Derry in 1983, captained Derry minors to Ulster success in 1984 and who won a Sigerson medal with St Mary's University College Belfast in 1989. Stephen Mulvenna won an All-Ireland senior medal with Derry in 1993. Club Members Kevin Bryson, Tony Grey, Simon Greene, Joe Grey, Jordan Curran, Paddy O’Kane and Mark Creane have all represented the Club at County level.

In administration lifelong member Colum O'Hara a former Club Chairman, Secretary, Vice-chairman and current Trustee of the Club served as Chairman of the North Derry Board and a member of the County Committee. Former Treasurer and Secretary Philip Bryson served on the North Derry Board as Registrar. Long serving member and former Club Secretary Breige McGuinness served in various County Committee roles including Assistant Secretary. Long standing committee member, Club assistant Secretary and later Secretary Conor Nicholl was member of various County sub-committees and was elected County GAA Public Relations Officer serving from 2016 to 2020.

Football titles

Senior Football
 Ulster Junior Club Football Championship
 Runners-up 2015
 North Derry Senior Football Championship: 1
1943
 Derry Intermediate Football Championship: 5
 1978, 1981, 1996, 1998, 1999
 Derry Junior Football Championship: 2
1975, 2015
 Dr Kerlin Cup: 3
1943, 1947, 1950 (shared with Dungiven)

Minor Football
 Derry City Minor Football Championship: 1
 1959
 Derry All County Minor 'B' Championship: 
 2013

Under 16 Football
 North Derry Under-16 'B' Football Championship: 1
 1999
 North Derry Under-16 'B' Football League: 1
 2006
 Derry All-County A Under-16 Championship': 1
 1984
 Derry All- County Under-16 'A' Football League: 1
 2013

Under 14 Football
     North Derry Under-14 ‘A’ Football championship: 1
    1995
 North Derry Under-14 'B' Football Championship: 3
 1998, 2001, 2002
 North Derry Under-14 'B' Football League: 1
 2002
Derry Féile na nÓg: 1
 2019
All-Ireland Féile na nÓg:1
2019

Under 12 Football
 Limavady Blitz: 2
 1984, 2005
 Drumsurn Blitz: 2
 1984, 2005

Ladies' football titles

Ladies Senior Football
 Derry Ladies' Football Championship: 5
 2006, 2012, 2014, 2018, 2020.

Note: The above lists may be incomplete. Please add any other honours you know of.

See also
Derry Intermediate Football Championship
List of Gaelic games clubs in Derry

External links
St. Mary's GAC website
Derry GAA website
Derry Club GAA
The Vale Centre
Faughanvale GAC

References

Gaelic games clubs in County Londonderry
Gaelic football clubs in County Londonderry
Gaelic Athletic Association clubs established in 1933